La Haye-d'Ectot is a commune in the Manche department in Normandy in north-western France.

See also
Communes of the Manche department

References

Hayedectot